Citadel Island Lighthouse was built in 1913. In 1982, it was replaced by a GRP cabinet while the light was converted to solar power.  The old lantern was dismantled in 1992 and removed to Port Albert, where it was restored for display at the Port Albert Maritime Museum in 2004.

See also

 List of lighthouses in Australia

Notes

References
 
 

Lighthouses completed in 1913
Lighthouses in Victoria (Australia)
1913 establishments in Australia